Guralnik or Guralnick may refer to:
Gerald Guralnik (1936–2014), American physicist
Orna Guralnik (born 1964), American-Israeli psychologist
Peter Guralnick (born 1943), American music critic, author, and screenwriter
Robert Guralnick (born 1950), American mathematician
Walter Guralnick (1916–2017), American dentist

See also
 
 

Ukrainian-language surnames